Hamilton and Rhoda Littlefield House is a historic home located at Oswego in Oswego County, New York.  It is a two-story frame vernacular Federal style residence built about 1834 and remodeled in the 1920s.  In 1853, Hamilton Littlefield sheltered one fugitive slave sent to him by Gerrit Smith's agent John B. Edwards, and later sheltered 15 freedom seekers all at once.  Therefore, the house is documented to have been used as a way station on the Underground Railroad.

It was listed on the National Register of Historic Places in 2002.

References

Houses on the National Register of Historic Places in New York (state)
Houses completed in 1834
Houses in Oswego County, New York
Houses on the Underground Railroad
National Register of Historic Places in Oswego County, New York
Underground Railroad in New York (state)